Subtropical Storm One was a short-lived subtropical cyclone that brought copious amounts of rainfall to central Florida in late June 1974. The storm originated in an area of convection that detached from a tropical depression over the southwestern Gulf of Mexico on June 24. A new area of low pressure developed underneath the convection and the system began to intensify. Later that day, the storm had become sufficiently organized to be classified as a subtropical depression. Early on June 25, it made landfall near Clearwater, Florida with winds of 50 mph (85 km/h) and later attained its peak intensity over eastern Florida with winds of 65 mph (100 km/h). After reemerging into the Atlantic Ocean, the system began to weaken as it underwent an extratropical transition. The storm ultimately dissipated off the coast of North Carolina early on June 26.

The heavy rainfall led to moderate flooding across the state. One tornado was confirmed to have touched down in association with the cyclone. Three people drowned as a result of the storm and damage amounted to $10 million (1974 USD, $ in 2009 USD).

Meteorological history

A tropical depression was situated over the southwestern Gulf of Mexico on June 22, 1974. By June 24, the depression began to weaken as it moved near the Mexican coastline, causing convective activity to move away from the center of circulation. Later that day, a new area of low pressure developed underneath the convection in the central Gulf of Mexico. It continued to mature, and around 1800 UTC, the system had become sufficiently organized to be classified as a subtropical depression. Although subtropical, the storm was operationally considered to be non-tropical, but was reassessed in a post-season analysis of the system. Early on June 25, the depression intensified into a subtropical storm as it neared the Florida coastline.

Reconnaissance missions were flown into the storm until it made landfall near Clearwater, Florida with winds of 50 mph (85 km/h) during the morning of June 25. Although over land, the system continued to intensify as it moved through the Florida Peninsula. Roughly six-hours after landfall, the storm attained its peak intensity with winds of 65 mph (100 km/h) and a barometric pressure of 1000 mbar (hPa; 29.53 inHg). Not long after attaining this intensity, the storm moved over the far western Atlantic Ocean and began to weaken. Later that day, it began to undergo an extratropical transition, acquiring frontal features and elongated convection. The storm completed this transition within 12 hours before becoming poorly defined and dissipating off the North Carolina coastline early on June 26.

Preparations and impact

Following the formation of the system, the National Hurricane Center issued small craft advisories and gale warnings for most of the Florida coastline. The National Hurricane Center reported that up to  fell near Tampa. In a 24-hour span,  of rain fell in Inverness. Two runways at the St. Petersburg-Clearwater International Airport were submerged in flood waters during the storm.

Offshore, waves up to  affected coastal areas. Several vessels became stranded in the storm, resulted in many Coast Guard rescues, many by towing the ships back to shore. A tornado was reported near Fort Myers. Additionally, two waterspouts touched down near Sarasota; however, both struck unpopulated areas and left no damage. Beach erosion was common along many beaches in southeastern states. The most significant erosion took place between Cedar Key and Naples where coastal flooding was reported. After moving through Florida, the subtropical storm brought gusty winds and light to moderate rainfall to Georgia, South Carolina and North Carolina. Throughout Florida, three people were killed by the storm from drowning and floods left roughly $10 million (1974 USD, $ in 2009 USD) in damage.

See also

1974 Atlantic hurricane season
Timeline of the 1974 Atlantic hurricane season
List of Florida hurricanes (1950–1974)

References

External links
National Hurricane Center
Monthly Weather Review for 1974

1974 Atlantic hurricane season
01 1974
01 1974
1974 in Florida